is a passenger railway station located in the city of Kawachinagano, Osaka Prefecture, Japan, operated by the private railway operator Kintetsu Railway. It has the station number "O22".

Lines

Layout
The station consists of a single ground-level side platform serving one bi-directional track. When the station was opened in 1911, it had two side platforms serving two tracks, but the northbound track (towards Osaka Abenobashi) was removed in June 1966. The disused second platform can still be seen.

Platforms

Adjacent stations

History
Shionomiya Station opened on August 15, 1911.

Passenger statistics
In fiscal 2019, the station was used by an average of 1079 passengers daily.

Surrounding area
 Shionomiya Onsen Hospital
Chiyoda Shrine
 Mejiro Fudo Ganshoji Temple

See also
 List of railway stations in Japan

References

External links

  Shionomiya Station from Kintetsu Railway website 

Railway stations in Japan opened in 1911
Stations of Kintetsu Railway
Railway stations in Osaka Prefecture
Kawachinagano